71 (seventy-one) is the natural number following 70 and preceding 72.



In mathematics
71 is:
the 20th prime number. The next is 73, with which it composes a twin prime.
a permutable prime and emirp with 17.
 the largest number which occurs as a prime factor of an order of a sporadic simple group.
the sum of three consecutive primes: 19, 23, and 29.
a centered heptagonal number.
an Eisenstein prime with no imaginary part and real part of the form .
a Pillai prime, since  is divisible by 71, but 71 is not one more than a multiple of 9.
the largest (15th) supersingular prime, which is also a Chen prime.
part of the last known pair (71, 7) of Brown numbers, since .
the twenty-third term of the Euclid–Mullin sequence, as it is the least prime factor of one more than the product of the first twenty-two terms.
the smallest positive integer  such that the imaginary quadratic field  has class number = 7.
the algebraic degree of Conway's constant, a remarkable number arising in the study of look-and-say sequences.
the sum of primes less than 71 (2 through 67) is 568, which is divisible by 71.
71 is the only number between 1 and 100 that is one less or one more than divisible by all numbers from 2 to 10 (70: 2, 5, 7, 10) (72: 2, 3, 4, 6, 8, 9).
71 is an index of a prime Lucas number.

In science
The atomic number of lutetium, a lanthanide

In astronomy

 Messier object M71, a magnitude 8.5 globular cluster in the constellation Sagitta
 The New General Catalogue object NGC 71, a magnitude 13.2 peculiar spiral galaxy in the constellation Andromeda

In other fields

Seventy-one is also:
 The number of different characters that can be used with a standard English keyboard, excluding uppercase letters
 The registry of the U.S. Navy's nuclear aircraft carrier USS Theodore Roosevelt (CVN-71), named after U.S. President Theodore Roosevelt
 The number of the French department Saône-et-Loire
 The year AD 71, 71 BC, or 1971
 In the Mexican television sitcom, El Chavo del Ocho, Doña Clotilde lives in the apartment number 71, being therefore known as "La Bruja del 71" (Spanish: "The Witch from Number 71")
 Lockheed SR-71 Blackbird long-range, Mach 3 strategic reconnaissance aircraft
 71 Fragments of a Chronology of Chance, a film by Michael Haneke
 71: Into the Fire, South Korean film about the Korean War
 The form number for the United States Office of Personnel Management for requesting a leave of absence
 The Irish Rail 071 Class diesel locomotive
 In the Jason Bourne novels by American author Robert Ludlum the department within the CIA which made Bourne and the other super agents is called Treadstone Seventy-One.
 SR-71, an American alternative rock band
 The number of the laps of the Austrian Grand Prix, Mexican Grand Prix, and Brazilian Grand Prix

References 

Integers